The California Bearing Ratio (CBR) is a measure of the strength of the subgrade of a road or other paved area, and of the materials used in its construction.

The ratio is measured using a standardized penetration test first developed by the California Division of Highways for highway engineering. Empirical tests measure the strength of the material and are not a true representation of the resilient modulus.

Definition 
The CBR is the ratio of the bearing load that penetrates a material to a specific depth compared with the load giving the same penetration into crushed stone.  The test measures neither Stiffness 
Modulus nor Shear Strength directly, but gives a combined measure of both.

Penetration is measured by applying the bearing load on the sample using a standard plunger of diameter 50 mm at the rate of 1.25 mm/min. The CBR is expressed as a percentage of the actual load causing the penetrations of 2.5 mm or 5.0 mm to the standard loads on crushed stone. A load penetration curve is drawn.

The CBR can be mathematically expressed as:

Test procedure 

Although the force increases with the depth of penetration, in most cases, it does not increase as quickly as it does for the standard crushed rock, so the ratio decreases.  In some cases, the ratio at 5 mm may be greater than that at 2.5 mm. If this occurs, the ratio at 5 mm should be used. The CBR is a measure of resistance of a material to penetration of a standard plunger under controlled density and moisture conditions. The test procedure should be strictly adhered to if a high degree of reproducibility is desired. The CBR test may be conducted on a remolded or undisturbed specimen in the laboratory. The test is simple and has been extensively investigated for field correlations of flexible pavement thickness requirement.

The laboratory CBR apparatus consists of a mould of 150 mm diameter with a base plate and a collar, a loading frame and dial gauges for measuring the penetration values and the expansion on soaking. If a soaked (wet) measurement is desired, the specimen in the mould is soaked in water for four days and the swelling and water absorption values are noted. The surcharge weight is placed on the top of the specimen in the mould and the assembly is placed under the plunger of the loading frame.

Example values 

CBR values for common soil subgrades can be estimated according to the USC soil types, for example: clay around 2%, sand from 7% (poorly graded) to 10% (well graded), well graded sandy gravel 15%, clayey sand 5-20%, silty gravel 20-60%, gravel from 30-60% poorly-graded to 40-80% if well-graded.

References

Road transport
Pavements
Tests in geotechnical laboratories